Milad Intezar (Dari: میلاد انتظار, born 4 November 1992) is a Afghan professional footballer who plays as a midfielder for Derde Divisie side SteDoCo.

Club career
Born in Kabul, Afghanistan Intezar escaped his country with his family at age 4, emigrating to the Netherlands. At age 6, he joined local club CVV Renkum. Then, at age 9, he transferred to the youth academy of NEC Nijmegen. He left the club after almost 10 years to join FC Oss. He made his first-team debut against EVV in the KNVB, playing 7 minutes. After playing 15 games for FC Oss he left and joined FC Lienden.
He won the Topklasse with FC Lienden in the seasons 2014–2015 and 2015–2016. He also won the overall championship in 2014–2015 which means his club was the best amateur club in the Netherlands.

In February 2020, it was announced that Intezar would move to Derde Divisie club SteDoCo after the 2019–20 season.

International career
In 2015, Intezar received his first call-up to the Afghanistan senior side for a training camp in Dubai. However, he was not selected amongst the players for the friendly matches against Laos and Bangladesh. He eventually made his debut in September 2016 against Lebanon. 
 In his debut he received 2 yellow cards and got suspended for the following match against Malaysia.

References

External links

1992 births
Living people
Association football midfielders
Footballers from Kabul
Afghanistan international footballers
TOP Oss players
Afghan emigrants to the Netherlands
FC Lienden players
SteDoCo players
Tweede Divisie players
Derde Divisie players
Afghan footballers
Afghan expatriate sportspeople in the Netherlands
Expatriate footballers in the Netherlands